Jan Victors or Fictor (bapt. June 13, 1619 – December 1679) was a Dutch Golden Age painter mainly of history paintings of Biblical scenes, with some genre scenes.  He may have been a pupil of Rembrandt.  He probably died in the Dutch East Indies.

He was a conscientious member of the Calvinist Dutch Reformed Church, and for this reason he avoided creating art which depicts Christ, angels, or nudity.

Biography
Victors was born in Amsterdam.  He was described in a Haarlem tax listing in 1622 as a student of Rembrandt van Rijn. Though it is not certain that he worked for Rembrandt, it is clear from his Young girl at a window that he had looked carefully at Rembrandt's paintings. He was only twenty when he painted this scene, and the look of expectation on the girl's face shows a remarkable study of character. He seems to have abandoned painting well before the rampjaar of 1672, when, like many painters in Amsterdam, he fell onto bad times and took a position as ziekentrooster ("comforter of the sick"), a role as professional nurse and cleric, with the Dutch East India Company in 1676. He probably died soon after arrival in Indonesia, then the Dutch East Indies.

References

External links

Ruth and Naomi of 1653: an unpublished painting by Jan Victors
Works and literature at PubHist
Link about Victors
Getty biography of Victors
Esther Accusing Haman by Jan Victors from the Museum & Gallery collection in Greenville, SC

1619 births
1679 deaths
Dutch Golden Age painters
Dutch male painters
Painters from Amsterdam
Dutch Calvinist and Reformed Christians
Calvinist and Reformed artists
Pupils of Rembrandt
Dutch nurses